Battle of Thessalonica, Siege of Thessalonica, or Sack of Thessalonica may refer to:

 Siege of Thessalonica (254), an attack on the city by Goths
 Battle of Thessalonica (380), a Gothic victory over the Roman army
 Siege of Thessalonica (586 or 597), a siege of the city by Slavs and Avars, part of the Avar-Byzantine wars
 Siege of Thessalonica (604), an attack on the city by Slavs, part of the Avar-Byzantine wars
 Siege of Thessalonica (615), an attack on the city by Slavs
 Siege of Thessalonica (617), an attack on the city by Slavs and Avars
 Siege of Thessalonica (676–678), a siege of the city by Slavs
 Sack of Thessalonica (904), a sack of the city by an Arab fleet
 Battle of Thessalonica (995), a Bulgarian victory over the Byzantines
 Battle of Thessalonica (1004), a Bulgarian victory over the Byzantines
 Battle of Thessalonica (1014), a Byzantine victory over the Bulgarians
 Battle of Thessalonica (1040), a Bulgarian victory over the Byzantines
 Battle of Thessalonica (2nd 1040), a Byzantine victory over the Bulgarians
 Sack of Thessalonica (1185), a sack of the city by the Normans
 Siege of Thessalonica (1383–1387), capture of the city by the Ottoman Empire from the Byzantines
 Siege of Thessalonica (1422–1430), capture of the city by the Ottoman Empire from Venice